Theodorus "Theo" Antonius Marie Zwarthoed (born 19 November 1982) is a Dutch former professional footballer who played as a goalkeeper.

Career
Zwarthoed was born in Volendam. Having previously been part of the youth system at RKAV Volendam, he joined the youth set-up at FC Volendam. He joined Volendam's first team squad for the 2000–01 season.

Following a transfer to AZ, he made his Eredivisie debut on 20 February 2002, keeping a clean sheet in an away match against Sparta Rotterdam. (0–4) He later played for SBV Excelsior, RKC Waalwijk, De Graafschap, Go Ahead Eagles, De Dijk and NAC Breda.

Zwarthoed retired from active football after the 2018–19 season, after which he continued as goalkeeper coach at AFC as the replacement for Dennis Gentenaar.

References

External links
 
 Voetbal International profile 

Living people
1982 births
People from Volendam
Association football goalkeepers
Dutch footballers
Excelsior Rotterdam players
AZ Alkmaar players
RKC Waalwijk players
FC Volendam players
De Graafschap players
Go Ahead Eagles players
ASV De Dijk players
NAC Breda players
Eredivisie players
Eerste Divisie players
Footballers from North Holland